In mathematics, the Shafarevich conjecture, named for Igor Shafarevich, may refer to:
The Tate–Shafarevich conjecture that the Tate–Shafarevich group is finite
The Shafarevich conjecture that there are only finitely many isomorphism classes of abelian varieties of fixed dimension and fixed polarization degree over a fixed number field with good reduction outside a given finite set of places, now proved as Faltings's theorem